Mun is the fifth solo studio album by Finnish musician Nopsajalka. The album was released on 10 April 2015.

Track listing

Charts

Release history

References

2015 albums
Nopsajalka albums
Finnish-language albums